The 2015–16 Rubin Kazan season was the 12th successive season that the club will play in the Russian Premier League, the highest tier of association football in Russia. Rubin was also taking part in the Russian Cup and the UEFA Europa League.

Squad

Out on loan

Reserves

Transfers

Summer

In:

Out:

Winter

In:

Out:

Competitions

Russian Premier League

Results by round

Matches

League table

Russian Cup

Europa league

Third qualifying round

Play-off round

Group stage

Squad statistics

Appearances and goals

|-
|colspan="14"|Players away from the club on loan:

|-
|colspan="14"|Players who appeared for Rubin Kazan but left during the season:

|}

Goal Scorers

Disciplinary record

References

FC Rubin Kazan seasons
Rubin Kazan
Rubin Kazan